Oskar "Ossi" Romm (18 December 1919 – 1 May 1993) was a Luftwaffe ace and recipient of the Knight's Cross of the Iron Cross during World War II.  The Knight's Cross of the Iron Cross was awarded to recognise extreme battlefield bravery or successful military leadership. During his career he was credited with 92 aerial victories, 82 on the Eastern Front and 10 on the Western Front.

Career

In September 1943, Romm was transferred to Ergänzungs-Jagdgruppe Ost, specialized training unit for new fighter pilots destined for the Eastern Front, as an instructor. During this assignment, he was awarded the German Cross in Gold on 17 October.

Despite being half Jewish, or Mischling under the Nuremberg Laws, Romm enlisted in the Luftwaffe and served with distinction. He was awarded his Knight's Cross of the Iron Cross on 29 February 1944 when his victory score stood at 76.

Western Front
By late May 1944, 2. Staffel of Jagdgeschwader 51 "Mölders" (JG 51—51st Fighter Wing) had been staffed with a full complement of 16 pilots, including Romm. The Staffel was ordered to relocate to the Western Front where it was attached to IV. Sturmgruppe of Jagdgeschwader 3 "Udet" (JG 3—3rd Fighter Wing) as fourth squadron fighting in Defense of the Reich. There, the Staffel was underwent conversion training to the Focke Wulf Fw 190 radial engine powered fighter aircraft. At the time, IV. Sturmgruppe was based at Salzwedel and commanded by Hauptmann Wilhelm Moritz.

Romm was appointed Staffelkapitän (squadron leader) of 12. Sturmstaffel of JG 3 on 7 July 1944. He replaced Oberleutnant Hans Rachner who had been killed in action that day. On 7 July, a force of 1,129 B-17 Flying Fortress and B-24 Liberator bombers of the United States Army Air Forces (USAAF) Eighth Air Force had set out from England to bomb aircraft factories in the Leipzig area and the synthetic oil plants at Boehlen, Leuna-Merseburg and Lützkendorf. This formation was intercepted by a German Gefechtsverband (combat formation) consisting of IV. Sturmgruppe of JG 3, led by Moritz, escorted by two Gruppen of Bf 109s from Jagdgeschwader 300 (JG 300—300th Fighter Wing) led by Major Walther Dahl. Dahl and Moritz drove the attack to point-blank range behind the Liberators of the 492d Bombardment Group before opening fire. 492d Bombardment Group was temporarily without fighter cover. Within about a minute the entire squadron of twelve B-24s had been annihilated. The Germans claimed 28 USAAF 2nd Air Division B-24 bombers that day and were credited with at least 21. The majority to the Sturmgruppe attack. This figure includes one B-24 bomber claimed shot down by Romm. In total, Luftwaffe pilots claimed the destruction of 60 bombers while actual losses were 28 bombers destroyed and further bombers returned with various levels of combat damage. The authors Prien, Stemmer and Bock state that the consolidated attack flown in close formation by the Sturmgruppe resulted in overclaiming of aerial victories caused by the confusing combat situation. During these attacks, multiple pilots may have simultaneously fired at the same bomber. It was therefore unclear who was responsible for the destruction of the bomber.

On 18 July, the USAAF Fifteenth Air Force attacked the Luftwaffe Memmingen Airfield. The Sturmgruppe intercepted the bombers and following the mission, the pilots claimed 36 heavy bombers shot down, including three Boeing B-17 Flying Fortress bombers by Romm. Two days later, the Sturmgruppe moved to an airfield at Schwaighofen near Neu-Ulm where they stayed until 30 July. The Sturmgruppe then moved to Schongau. There, 12. Sturmstaffel was renamed to 15. Sturmstaffel on 10 August.

In October 1944, Romm was transferred to I. Gruppe of JG 3 where he was tasked with the creation of a newly formed 4. Staffel. At the time, I. Gruppe was based at Bindersleben Airfield and commanded by Hauptmann Horst Haase. Command of 15. Sturmstaffel was then passed to Hauptmann Hubert-York Weydenhammer. Romm claimed his only aerial victory while serving with 4. Staffel on 2 November when he shot down a USAAF North American P-51 Mustang fighter. That day, the Eighth Air Force attacked the synthetic fuel factories at Leuna. The day ended with a defeat for the Luftwaffe with 72 pilots killed in action and further 32 pilots wounded. The USAAF lost 40 heavy bombers, further two crashed on their return to England, and 14 escort P-51 fighters shot down. In early December, Romm was transferred to I. Gruppe of Ergänzungs-Jagdgeschwader 1, a replacement training unit for fighter pilots. Command of 4. Staffel was then passed to Leutnant Franz Ruhl.

Eastern Front and end of war
On 12 January 1945, Soviet forces launched the Vistula–Oder offensive advancing into German-held territory, capturing Kraków, Warsaw and Poznań. In consequence, Romm as an experienced unit leader was transferred back to IV. Sturmgruppe of JG 3 again taking command of 15. Sturmstaffel. He took command from Leutnant Karl-Dieter Hecker who had taken command of the Sturmstaffel after Weydenhammer had been transferred in December 1944. On 21 January 1945, IV. With this transfer, the Sturmgruppe came under the control of the 1. Flieger-Division (1st Air Division), commanded by Generalmajor Robert Fuchs, and subordinated to II. Fliegerkorps (2nd Air Corps), headed by General der Flieger Martin Fiebig. Over the next weeks, the Sturmgruppe predominantly flew fighter-bomber missions in support of German ground forces retreating towards the Oder.

Reichsmarschall Hermann Göring, the commander-in-chief of the Luftwaffe, visited the Sturmgruppe on 13 February at Prenzlau. Göring was furious when he learned that the pilots were unable to fly missions due to lack of fuel. On 17 February 1945, Romm was appointed Gruppenkommandeur (group commander) of IV. Sturmgruppe of JG 3. He succeeded Major Erwin Bacsila who was transferred to Jagdgeschwader 400 (JG 400—400th Fighter Wing). Command of 15. Sturmstaffel was then passed to Leutnant Karl-Dieter Hecker. The next day, the Sturmgruppe flew ground support missions southeast of Stargard. During this mission, Luftwaffe pilots claimed four aerial victories, including an Il-2 ground-attack aircraft by Romm.

Summary of career

Aerial victory claims
According to US historian David T. Zabecki, Romm was credited with 92 aerial victories. Spick also lists Romm with 92 aerial victories, of which 82 were claimed over the Eastern Front and further 10 over the Western Front, claimed in 229 combat missions. Mathews and Foreman, authors of Luftwaffe Aces — Biographies and Victory Claims, researched the German Federal Archives and found records for 88 aerial victory claims. This figure includes 78 aerial victories on the Eastern Front and 10 over the Western Allies, including eight four-engined heavy bombers, claimed in 283 combat missions.

Victory claims were logged to a map-reference (PQ = Planquadrat), for example "PQ 07651". These sectors were then subdivided into 36 smaller units to give a location area 3 × 4 km in size.

Awards
 Flugzeugführerabzeichen
 Front Flying Clasp of the Luftwaffe
 Iron Cross (1939) 2nd and 1st Class
 Honor Goblet of the Luftwaffe on 1 November 1943 as Feldwebel and pilot
 German Cross in Gold on 17 October 1943 as Feldwebel in the I./Jagdgeschwader 51
 Knight's Cross of the Iron Cross on 29 February 1944 as Oberfeldwebel and pilot in the 1./Jagdgeschwader 51 "Mölders"

Notes

References

Citations

Bibliography

External links
Luftwaffe 1939–1945 History
TracesOfWar.com
Aces of the Luftwaffe

1919 births
1993 deaths
Luftwaffe pilots
German World War II flying aces
Recipients of the Gold German Cross
Recipients of the Knight's Cross of the Iron Cross
People from Liberec District
Czechoslovak people of German descent
Naturalized citizens of Germany